The 2003 Philadelphia Phillies season was the 121st season in the history of the franchise.  The Phillies finished in third place in the National League East, 15 games behind the Atlanta Braves, and five games behind the 2003 World Series champion Florida Marlins, who were the NL's wild-card winner.  The Phillies were managed by their former shortstop Larry Bowa, as they played their final season of home games at Veterans Stadium, before moving the club to Citizens Bank Park in 2004.

The Phillies missed the playoffs for the ninth straight season, tying a record set between 1984 and 1992

Offseason
December 2, 2002: David Bell was signed as a free agent with the Philadelphia Phillies.
 December 6, 2002: Jim Thome signed as a free agent with the Philadelphia Phillies.
 December 7, 2002: Dan Plesac was signed as a free agent with the Philadelphia Phillies.
 March 29, 2003: Wayne Gomes was signed as a free agent with the Philadelphia Phillies.

Regular season

Season standings

National League East

Record vs. opponents

Game log

|- style="background:#bfb"
| 1 || March 31 || @ Marlins || 8–5 || Kevin Millwood (1–0) || Josh Beckett (0–1) || José Mesa (1) || 37,137 || 1–0
|-

|- style="background:#bfb"
| 2 || April 2 || @ Marlins || 8–2 || Randy Wolf (1–0) || Carl Pavano (0–1) || None || 10,534 || 2–0
|- style="background:#fbb"
| 3 || April 3 || @ Marlins || 3–8 || Mark Redman (1–0) || Vicente Padilla (0–1) || None || 14,585 || 2–1
|- style="background:#fbb"
| 4 || April 4 || Pirates || 1–9 || Jeff Suppan (1–0) || Joe Roa (0–1) || Salomón Torres (1) || 59,269 || 2–2
|- style="background:#bfb"
| 5 || April 5 || Pirates || 16–1 || Carlos Silva (1–0) || Jeff D'Amico (0–1) || None || 22,693 || 3–2
|- style="background:#fbb"
| 6 || April 6 || Pirates || 0–2 || Kris Benson (2–0) || Brett Myers (0–1) || Mike Williams (3) || 30,113 || 3–3
|- style="background:#bfb"
| 7 || April 8 || Braves || 4–3 (10) || José Mesa (1–0) || Kevin Gryboski (0–1) || None || 13,283 || 4–3
|- style="background:#bfb"
| 8 || April 9 || Braves || 16–2 || Vicente Padilla (1–1) || Greg Maddux (0–3) || None || 14,724 || 5–3
|- style="background:#fbb"
| 9 || April 10 || Braves || 2–6 || Darren Holmes (1–0) || Joe Roa (0–2) || None || 14,840 || 5–4
|- style="background:#fbb"
| 10 || April 11 || @ Reds || 6–7 || Scott Williamson (2–0) || José Mesa (1–1) || None || 27,738 || 5–5
|- style="background:#bfb"
| 11 || April 12 || @ Reds || 8–5 || Kevin Millwood (2–0) || Jimmy Haynes (0–3) || None || 28,598 || 6–5
|- style="background:#bfb"
| 12 || April 13 || @ Reds || 13–1 || Randy Wolf (2–0) || Ryan Dempster (1–1) || None || 24,535 || 7–5
|- style="background:#bfb"
| 13 || April 14 || Marlins || 5–2 || Vicente Padilla (2–1) || A. J. Burnett (0–1) || José Mesa (2) || 13,611 || 8–5
|- style="background:#bfb"
| 14 || April 15 || Marlins || 4–3 || Carlos Silva (2–0) || Josh Beckett (1–2) || José Mesa (3) || 17,508 || 9–5
|- style="background:#fbb"
| 15 || April 16 || Marlins || 1–3 || Brad Penny (2–1) || Brett Myers (0–2) || Braden Looper (2) || 15,167 || 9–6
|- style="background:#fbb"
| 16 || April 17 || Marlins || 3–7 || Carl Pavano (2–2) || Kevin Millwood (2–1) || None || 13,968 || 9–7
|- style="background:#fbb"
| 17 || April 18 || @ Braves || 4–5 || Kevin Gryboski (1–1) || Randy Wolf (2–1) || John Smoltz (6) || 28,100 || 9–8
|- style="background:#bfb"
| 18 || April 19 || @ Braves || 4–0 || Vicente Padilla (3–1) || Mike Hampton (0–1) || None || 29,777 || 10–8
|- style="background:#fbb"
| 19 || April 20 || @ Braves || 1–8 || Shane Reynolds (1–0) || Brandon Duckworth (0–1) || None || 22,978 || 10–9
|- style="background:#bfb"
| 20 || April 22 || Rockies || 5–2 || Kevin Millwood (3–1) || Darren Oliver (0–2) || José Mesa (4) || 13,431 || 11–9
|- style="background:#bfb"
| 21 || April 23 || Rockies || 6–4 || Brett Myers (1–2) || Jason Jennings (1–3) || José Mesa (5) || 13,444 || 12–9
|- style="background:#bfb"
| 22 || April 24 || Rockies || 9–1 || Randy Wolf (3–1) || Aaron Cook (1–2) || None || 16,947 || 13–9
|- style="background:#fbb"
| 23 || April 25 || Giants || 4–7 || Joe Nathan (2–0) || Vicente Padilla (3–2) || None || 20,650 || 13–10
|- style="background:#bfb"
| 24 || April 26 || Giants || 10–2 || Brandon Duckworth (1–1) || Jerome Williams (0–1) || Carlos Silva (1) || 19,464 || 14–10
|- style="background:#bfb"
| 25 || April 27 || Giants || 1–0 || Kevin Millwood (4–1) || Jesse Foppert (0–2) || None || 40,016 || 15–10
|- style="background:#bfb"
| 26 || April 28 || @ Dodgers || 3–0 || Brett Myers (2–2) || Darren Dreifort (1–3) || José Mesa (6) || 24,241 || 16–10
|- style="background:#fbb"
| 27 || April 29 || @ Dodgers || 2–6 || Kevin Brown (2–1) || Randy Wolf (3–2) || None || 27,815 || 16–11
|- style="background:#fbb"
| 28 || April 30 || @ Dodgers || 0–4 || Odalis Pérez (1–1) || Vicente Padilla (3–3) || Éric Gagné (8) || 24,940 || 16–12
|-

|- style="background:#bfb"
| 29 || May 1 || @ Dodgers || 4–1 || Brandon Duckworth (2–1) || Hideo Nomo (3–4) || José Mesa (7) || 24,008 || 17–12
|- style="background:#fbb"
| 30 || May 2 || @ Padres || 4–5 (10) || Mike Matthews (1–0) || José Mesa (1–2) || None || 20,595 || 17–13
|- style="background:#bfb"
| 31 || May 3 || @ Padres || 5–4 (10) || Carlos Silva (3–0) || Jaret Wright (1–4) || José Mesa (8) || 29,725 || 18–13
|- style="background:#bfb"
| 32 || May 4 || @ Padres || 3–1 || Randy Wolf (4–2) || Adam Eaton (1–3) || José Mesa (9) || 21,526 || 19–13
|- style="background:#fbb"
| 33 || May 5 || @ Diamondbacks || 1–10 || Miguel Batista (2–2) || Vicente Padilla (3–4) || None || 25,407 || 19–14
|- style="background:#fbb"
| 34 || May 6 || @ Diamondbacks || 5–6 || Óscar Villarreal (3–2) || Terry Adams (0–1) || None || 32,151 || 19–15
|- style="background:#bfb"
| 35 || May 7 || @ Diamondbacks || 5–2 || Kevin Millwood (5–1) || Brandon Webb (1–1) || José Mesa (10) || 28,485 || 20–15
|- style="background:#bfb"
| 36 || May 9 || Astros || 5–3 || Brett Myers (3–2) || Roy Oswalt (2–4) || José Mesa (11) || 20,109 || 21–15
|- style="background:#bfb"
| 37 || May 10 || Astros || 2–0 || Randy Wolf (5–2) || Wade Miller (1–4) || None || 20,726 || 22–15
|- style="background:#fbb"
| 38 || May 11 || Astros || 7–10 || Pete Munro (2–1) || Vicente Padilla (3–5) || Billy Wagner (8) || 29,054 || 22–16
|- style="background:#fbb"
| 39 || May 13 || Diamondbacks || 1–6 || Mike Koplove (1–3) || José Mesa (1–3) || None || 19,016 || 22–17
|- style="background:#fbb"
| 40 || May 14 || Diamondbacks || 0–2 || Curt Schilling (3–2) || Brett Myers (3–3) || None || 19,195 || 22–18
|- style="background:#bfb"
| 41 || May 15 || Diamondbacks || 6–4 || Rhéal Cormier (1–0) || Óscar Villarreal (3–3) || José Mesa (12) || 24,012 || 23–18
|- style="background:#fbb"
| 42 || May 16 || @ Astros || 2–4 || Octavio Dotel (3–1) || Turk Wendell (0–1) || Billy Wagner (10) || 28,085 || 23–19
|- style="background:#bfb"
| 43 || May 17 || @ Astros || 9–4 || Brandon Duckworth (3–1) || Nate Bland (1–1) || None || 30,289 || 24–19
|- style="background:#bfb"
| 44 || May 18 || @ Astros || 3–1 || Kevin Millwood (6–1) || Tim Redding (3–3) || None || 28,585 || 25–19
|- style="background:#bfb"
| 45 || May 20 || @ Mets || 11–7 || Brett Myers (4–3) || Graeme Lloyd (1–1) || None || 25,281 || 26–19
|- style="background:#fbb"
| 46 || May 21 || @ Mets || 4–5 || Armando Benítez (1–3) || Terry Adams (0–2) || None || 29,551 || 26–20
|- style="background:#fbb"
| 47 || May 22 || @ Mets || 3–6 || Pedro Astacio (3–1) || Vicente Padilla (3–6) || Armando Benítez (13) || 20,101 || 26–21
|- style="background:#bfb"
| 48 || May 23 || @ Expos || 4–2 || Kevin Millwood (7–1) || Zach Day (4–2) || José Mesa (13) || 9,511 || 27–21
|- style="background:#fbb"
| 49 || May 24 || @ Expos || 2–3 || Luis Ayala (5–1) || Carlos Silva (3–1) || None || 33,236 || 27–22
|- style="background:#fbb"
| 50 || May 25 || @ Expos || 3–5 || Javier Vázquez (5–2) || Brett Myers (4–4) || Rocky Biddle (14) || 17,023 || 27–23
|- style="background:#fbb"
| 51 || May 27 || Mets || 2–4 || Al Leiter (5–2) || Randy Wolf (5–3) || Armando Benítez (15) || 18,081 || 27–24
|- style="background:#bfb"
| 52 || May 28 || Mets || 11–3 || Vicente Padilla (4–6) || Pedro Astacio (3–2) || None || 21,389 || 28–24
|- style="background:#fbb"
| 53 || May 29 || Mets || 0–5 || Steve Trachsel (4–2) || Kevin Millwood (7–2) || None || 19,568 || 28–25
|- style="background:#bfb"
| 54 || May 30 || Expos || 12–5 || Rhéal Cormier (2–0) || Javier Vázquez (5–3) || None || 18,311 || 29–25
|- style="background:#bbb"
| – || May 31 || Expos || colspan=6 | Postponed (rain); Makeup: June 1 as a traditional double-header
|-

|- style="background:#bfb"
| 55 || June 1 (1) || Expos || 4–3 || Randy Wolf (6–3) || Liván Hernández (4–4) || José Mesa (14) || see 2nd game || 30–25
|- style="background:#bfb"
| 56 || June 1 (2) || Expos || 4–1 || Brett Myers (5–4) || Dan Smith (2–2) || José Mesa (15) || 36,685 || 31–25
|- style="background:#fbb"
| 57 || June 3 || Mariners || 0–4 || Jamie Moyer (9–2) || Kevin Millwood (7–3) || None || 18,029 || 31–26
|- style="background:#fbb"
| 58 || June 4 || Mariners || 2–7 || Gil Meche (8–2) || Vicente Padilla (4–7) || None || 16,232 || 31–27
|- style="background:#fbb"
| 59 || June 5 || Mariners || 4–5 || Julio Mateo (1–0) || José Mesa (1–4) || Kazuhiro Sasaki (10) || 21,145 || 31–28
|- style="background:#fbb"
| 60 || June 6 || Athletics || 4–7 || Barry Zito (7–4) || Brett Myers (5–5) || None || 29,583 || 31–29
|- style="background:#bbb"
| – || June 7 || Athletics || colspan=6 | Postponed (rain); Makeup: June 8 as a traditional double-header
|- style="background:#bfb"
| 61 || June 8 (1) || Athletics || 7–1 || Kevin Millwood (8–3) || Mark Mulder (8–4) || None || see 2nd game || 32–29
|- style="background:#bfb"
| 62 || June 8 (2) || Athletics || 8–3 || Randy Wolf (7–3) || Aaron Harang (0–1) || None || 37,662 || 33–29
|- style="background:#bfb"
| 63 || June 9 || @ Angels || 3–0 || Vicente Padilla (5–7) || Jarrod Washburn (6–6) || José Mesa (16) || 25,902 || 34–29
|- style="background:#fbb"
| 64 || June 10 || @ Angels || 1–2 || John Lackey (4–5) || Brandon Duckworth (3–2) || Troy Percival (9) || 34,037 || 34–30
|- style="background:#fbb"
| 65 || June 11 || @ Angels || 3–5 || Ben Weber (2–0) || Brett Myers (5–6) || Troy Percival (10) || 31,130 || 34–31
|- style="background:#fbb"
| 66 || June 13 || @ Reds || 1–15 || Jimmy Haynes (1–5) || Kevin Millwood (8–4) || None || 30,144 || 34–32
|- style="background:#bfb"
| 67 || June 14 || @ Reds || 12–2 || Randy Wolf (8–3) || Danny Graves (3–6) || None || 35,398 || 35–32
|- style="background:#bbb"
| – || June 15 || @ Reds || colspan=6 | Postponed (rain); Makeup: July 28
|- style="background:#bfb"
| 68 || June 17 || Braves || 5–4 || Turk Wendell (1–1) || Darren Holmes (1–1) || None || 24,133 || 36–32
|- style="background:#fbb"
| 69 || June 18 || Braves || 1–6 || Russ Ortiz (8–4) || Kevin Millwood (8–5) || None || 26,475 || 36–33
|- style="background:#bfb"
| 70 || June 19 || Braves || 3–2 || José Mesa (2–4) || John Smoltz (0–1) || None || 27,207 || 37–33
|- style="background:#bbb"
| – || June 20 || Red Sox || colspan=6 | Postponed (rain); Makeup: September 1
|- style="background:#bfb"
| 71 || June 21 || Red Sox || 6–5 (13) || José Mesa (3–4) || Rudy Seánez (0–1) || None || 35,512 || 38–33
|- style="background:#bfb"
| 72 || June 22 || Red Sox || 5–0 || Brett Myers (6–6) || Byung-hyun Kim (2–6) || None || 60,960 || 39–33
|- style="background:#fbb"
| 73 || June 24 || @ Braves || 3–5 || Russ Ortiz (9–4) || Kevin Millwood (8–6) || John Smoltz (28) || 31,796 || 39–34
|- style="background:#bfb"
| 74 || June 25 || @ Braves || 8–1 || Vicente Padilla (6–7) || Greg Maddux (6–7) || None || 31,724 || 40–34
|- style="background:#bfb"
| 75 || June 26 || @ Braves || 8–1 || Randy Wolf (9–3) || Mike Hampton (3–4) || None || 30,405 || 41–34
|- style="background:#bfb"
| 76 || June 27 || @ Orioles || 4–2 (17) || Dan Plesac (1–0) || Omar Daal (4–10) || Héctor Mercado (1) || 46,405 || 42–34
|- style="background:#bfb"
| 77 || June 28 || @ Orioles || 9–5 || Brett Myers (7–6) || Pat Hentgen (1–5) || None || 49,549 || 43–34
|- style="background:#bfb"
| 78 || June 29 || @ Orioles || 4–3 || Kevin Millwood (9–6) || Rick Helling (5–6) || José Mesa (17) || 44,723 || 44–34
|- style="background:#bfb"
| 79 || June 30 || Cubs || 4–3 || Vicente Padilla (7–7) || Shawn Estes (6–7) || José Mesa (18) || 23,323 || 45–34
|-

|- style="background:#bfb"
| 80 || July 1 || Cubs || 4–3 || Terry Adams (1–2) || Mike Remlinger (4–2) || None || 25,307 || 46–34
|- style="background:#fbb"
| 81 || July 2 || Cubs || 0–1 || Kyle Farnsworth (3–0) || Turk Wendell (1–2) || Joe Borowski (16) || 23,591 || 46–35
|- style="background:#bfb"
| 82 || July 3 || Cubs || 12–2 || Brett Myers (8–6) || Carlos Zambrano (6–7) || None || 57,326 || 47–35
|- style="background:#fbb"
| 83 || July 4 || Marlins || 1–2 || Braden Looper (4–2) || José Mesa (3–5) || None || 19,690 || 47–36
|- style="background:#fbb"
| 84 || July 5 || Marlins || 4–5 || Brad Penny (7–6) || Vicente Padilla (7–8) || Braden Looper (15) || 52,110 || 47–37
|- style="background:#fbb"
| 85 || July 6 || Marlins || 3–6 || Mark Redman (7–3) || Randy Wolf (9–4) || None || 26,244 || 47–38
|- style="background:#fbb"
| 86 || July 7 || @ Expos || 1–8 || Liván Hernández (8–6) || Brandon Duckworth (3–3) || None || 7,099 || 47–39
|- style="background:#bfb"
| 87 || July 8 || @ Expos || 13–6 || Brett Myers (9–6) || Claudio Vargas (6–4) || None || 8,225 || 48–39
|- style="background:#bfb"
| 88 || July 9 || @ Expos || 2–0 || Kevin Millwood (10–6) || Tomo Ohka (7–9) || None || 7,005 || 49–39
|- style="background:#bfb"
| 89 || July 10 || @ Mets || 7–2 || Vicente Padilla (8–8) || Steve Trachsel (8–6) || None || 25,913 || 50–39
|- style="background:#bfb"
| 90 || July 11 || @ Mets || 10–3 || Randy Wolf (10–4) || Aaron Heilman (0–2) || None || 35,884 || 51–39
|- style="background:#bfb"
| 91 || July 12 || @ Mets || 4–2 (11) || José Mesa (4–5) || John Franco (0–1) || None || 33,452 || 52–39
|- style="background:#fbb"
| 92 || July 13 || @ Mets || 3–4 || Armando Benítez (3–3) || Terry Adams (1–3) || None || 31,630 || 52–40
|- style="background:#bbcaff;"
| – || July 15 ||colspan="7" |2003 Major League Baseball All-Star Game at U.S. Cellular Field in Chicago
|- style="background:#bfb"
| 93 || July 17 || Expos || 5–2 (11) || Dan Plesac (2–0) || Tim Drew (0–2) || None || 23,874 || 53–40
|- style="background:#fbb"
| 94 || July 18 || Expos || 1–3 || Javier Vázquez (7–6) || Randy Wolf (10–5) || None || 22,789 || 53–41
|- style="background:#bfb"
| 95 || July 19 || Expos || 4–3 (11) || José Mesa (5–5) || Héctor Almonte (0–2) || None || 28,794 || 54–41
|- style="background:#bfb"
| 96 || July 20 || Expos || 3–2 || Brett Myers (10–6) || Claudio Vargas (6–6) || José Mesa (19) || 37,552 || 55–41
|- style="background:#fbb"
| 97 || July 21 || Mets || 6–8 || Aaron Heilman (1–2) || Brandon Duckworth (3–4) || John Franco (1) || 33,208 || 55–42
|- style="background:#fbb"
| 98 || July 22 || Mets || 5–7 || Steve Trachsel (9–6) || Kevin Millwood (10–7) || Dan Wheeler (2) || 37,164 || 55–43
|- style="background:#bfb"
| 99 || July 23 || @ Cubs || 3–0 || Randy Wolf (11–5) || Matt Clement (7–9) || None || 40,377 || 56–43
|- style="background:#bfb"
| 100 || July 24 || @ Cubs || 14–6 || Vicente Padilla (9–8) || Kerry Wood (10–7) || None || 40,266 || 57–43
|- style="background:#fbb"
| 101 || July 25 || @ Marlins || 5–11 || Ugueth Urbina (1–4) || Mike Williams (1–4) || None || 18,106 || 57–44
|- style="background:#fbb"
| 102 || July 26 || @ Marlins || 5–10 || Josh Beckett (5–4) || Brandon Duckworth (3–5) || Braden Looper (18) || 20,545 || 57–45
|- style="background:#fbb"
| 103 || July 27 || @ Marlins || 6–7 || Ugueth Urbina (2–4) || Mike Williams (1–5) || None || 12,467 || 57–46
|- style="background:#fbb"
| 104 || July 28 || @ Reds || 5–6 (10) || Scott Williamson (5–3) || Terry Adams (1–4) || None || 29,200 || 57–47
|- style="background:#bfb"
| 105 || July 29 || Dodgers || 2–0 || Vicente Padilla (10–8) || Kaz Ishii (9–5) || José Mesa (20) || 31,099 || 58–47
|- style="background:#bfb"
| 106 || July 30 || Dodgers || 4–2 || Turk Wendell (2–2) || Paul Shuey (4–3) || José Mesa (21) || 26,580 || 59–47
|- style="background:#bfb"
| 107 || July 31 || Dodgers || 7–3 || Brandon Duckworth (4–5) || Odalis Pérez (6–9) || None || 24,932 || 60–47
|-

|- style="background:#bfb"
| 108 || August 1 || Padres || 6–0 || Kevin Millwood (11–7) || Kevin Jarvis (4–3) || None || 18,655 || 61–47
|- style="background:#fbb"
| 109 || August 2 (1) || Padres || 4–6 || Jake Peavy (9–8) || Randy Wolf (11–6) || None || see 2nd game || 61–48
|- style="background:#bfb"
| 110 || August 2 (2) || Padres || 10–4 || Rhéal Cormier (3–0) || Joe Roa (1–3) || None || 35,239 || 62–48
|- style="background:#fbb"
| 111 || August 3 || Padres || 2–5 (10) || Jay Witasick (3–2) || José Mesa (5–6) || Rod Beck (15) || 43,839 || 62–49
|- style="background:#bfb"
| 112 || August 5 || @ Rockies || 7–2 || Brett Myers (11–6) || Shawn Chacón (11–6) || None || 28,034 || 63–49
|- style="background:#fbb"
| 113 || August 6 || @ Rockies || 1–5 || Chin-hui Tsao (2–0) || Brandon Duckworth (4–6) || None || 27,599 || 63–50
|- style="background:#fbb"
| 114 || August 7 || @ Rockies || 3–4 || Javier López (3–1) || Kevin Millwood (11–8) || Justin Speier (7) || 27,855 || 63–51
|- style="background:#fbb"
| 115 || August 8 || @ Giants || 1–9 || Jesse Foppert (8–8) || Randy Wolf (11–7) || None || 42,595 || 63–52
|- style="background:#bfb"
| 116 || August 9 || @ Giants || 8–6 (10) || Turk Wendell (3–2) || Jim Brower (7–4) || None || 42,572 || 64–52
|- style="background:#fbb"
| 117 || August 10 || @ Giants || 2–5 || Kevin Correia (1–0) || Brett Myers (11–7) || None || 42,520 || 64–53
|- style="background:#fbb"
| 118 || August 12 || Brewers || 3–6 || Wayne Franklin (8–9) || Brandon Duckworth (4–7) || Dan Kolb (7) || 23,136 || 64–54
|- style="background:#bfb"
| 119 || August 13 || Brewers || 11–4 || Kevin Millwood (12–8) || Ben Sheets (10–10) || None || 24,683 || 65–54
|- style="background:#bfb"
| 120 || August 14 || Brewers || 4–3 || Randy Wolf (12–7) || Wes Obermueller (0–4) || Mike Williams (26) || 23,394 || 66–54
|- style="background:#bfb"
| 121 || August 15 || Cardinals || 7–4 || Vicente Padilla (11–8) || Woody Williams (14–6) || Dan Plesac (1) || 28,962 || 67–54
|- style="background:#bfb"
| 122 || August 16 || Cardinals || 5–4 || Brett Myers (12–7) || Dan Haren (3–4) || José Mesa (22) || 35,046 || 68–54
|- style="background:#bfb"
| 123 || August 17 || Cardinals || 6–4 || Amaury Telemaco (1–0) || Brett Tomko (9–8) || Mike Williams (27) || 42,153 || 69–54
|- style="background:#fbb"
| 124 || August 19 || @ Brewers || 4–6 || Mike DeJean (4–7) || Turk Wendell (3–3) || Dan Kolb (9) || 17,028 || 69–55
|- style="background:#fbb"
| 125 || August 20 || @ Brewers || 1–10 || Matt Kinney (8–9) || Randy Wolf (12–8) || None || 18,115 || 69–56
|- style="background:#fbb"
| 126 || August 21 || @ Brewers || 2–5 || Leo Estrella (4–2) || Vicente Padilla (11–9) || Dan Kolb (10) || 19,885 || 69–57
|- style="background:#bfb"
| 127 || August 22 || @ Cardinals || 9–4 || Rhéal Cormier (4–0) || Steve Kline (4–5) || None || 33,824 || 70–57
|- style="background:#fbb"
| 128 || August 23 || @ Cardinals || 3–5 || Sterling Hitchcock (2–3) || Amaury Telemaco (1–1) || Jason Isringhausen (14) || 37,318 || 70–58
|- style="background:#fbb"
| 129 || August 24 || @ Cardinals || 0–3 || Brett Tomko (10–8) || Kevin Millwood (12–9) || Mike DeJean (19) || 37,679 || 70–59
|- style="background:#fbb"
| 130 || August 25 || @ Expos || 1–12 || Liván Hernández (14–7) || Randy Wolf (12–9) || None || 30,501 || 70–60
|- style="background:#fbb"
| 131 || August 26 || @ Expos || 10–14 || Joey Eischen (2–2) || Mike Williams (1–6) || Luis Ayala (4) || 12,509 || 70–61
|- style="background:#fbb"
| 132 || August 27 || @ Expos || 6–9 || Héctor Almonte (1–2) || Dan Plesac (2–1) || Rocky Biddle (31) || 20,105 || 70–62
|- style="background:#fbb"
| 133 || August 28 || @ Expos || 0–4 || Javier Vázquez (12–8) || Amaury Telemaco (1–2) || None || 20,030 || 70–63
|- style="background:#bfb"
| 134 || August 29 || @ Mets || 7–0 || Kevin Millwood (13–9) || Steve Trachsel (13–8) || None || 33,208 || 71–63
|- style="background:#bfb"
| 135 || August 30 || @ Mets || 4–2 || Randy Wolf (13–9) || Tom Glavine (9–12) || José Mesa (23) || 26,769 || 72–63
|- style="background:#bfb"
| 136 || August 31 || @ Mets || 4–1 || Vicente Padilla (12–9) || Jae Weong Seo (8–9) || José Mesa (24) || 26,180 || 73–63
|-

|- style="background:#fbb"
| 137 || September 1 || Red Sox || 9–13 || Byung-hyun Kim (7–9) || José Mesa (5–7) || None || 61,068 || 73–64
|- style="background:#bfb"
| 138 || September 2 || Expos || 5–3 || Rhéal Cormier (5–0) || Javier Vázquez (12–9) || Dan Plesac (2) || 26,719 || 74–64
|- style="background:#bfb"
| 139 || September 3 || Expos || 8–3 || Kevin Millwood (14–9) || T. J. Tucker (0–2) || None || 18,002 || 75–64
|- style="background:#bfb"
| 140 || September 4 || Mets || 6–5 || Valerio De Los Santos (4–3) || Mike Stanton (2–6) || None || 19,259 || 76–64
|- style="background:#bfb"
| 141 || September 5 || Mets || 1–0 || Vicente Padilla (13–9) || Jae Weong Seo (8–10) || Rhéal Cormier (1) || 26,712 || 77–64
|- style="background:#bfb"
| 142 || September 6 || Mets || 9–6 || Brett Myers (13–7) || Jeremy Griffiths (1–2) || Turk Wendell (1) || 38,671 || 78–64
|- style="background:#bfb"
| 143 || September 7 || Mets || 5–4 (11) || Rhéal Cormier (6–0) || Dan Wheeler (1–3) || None || 29,159 || 79–64
|- style="background:#fbb"
| 144 || September 8 || @ Braves || 4–6 || Russ Ortiz (19–6) || Kevin Millwood (14–10) || Will Cunnane (2) || 17,543 || 79–65
|- style="background:#bfb"
| 145 || September 9 || @ Braves || 18–5 || Randy Wolf (14–9) || Shane Reynolds (11–9) || None || 21,257 || 80–65
|- style="background:#fbb"
| 146 || September 10 || @ Braves || 2–4 || Horacio Ramírez (10–4) || Vicente Padilla (13–10) || Will Cunnane (3) || 21,321 || 80–66
|- style="background:#bfb"
| 147 || September 11 || @ Braves || 8–3 || Brett Myers (14–7) || Greg Maddux (14–11) || None || 23,811 || 81–66
|- style="background:#fbb"
| 148 || September 12 || @ Pirates || 4–8 || Kip Wells (8–8) || Amaury Telemaco (1–3) || None || 18,895 || 81–67
|- style="background:#fbb"
| 149 || September 13 || @ Pirates || 3–5 || Josh Fogg (10–8) || Kevin Millwood (14–11) || Julián Tavárez (7) || 33,480 || 81–68
|- style="background:#bfb"
| 150 || September 14 || @ Pirates || 10–7 || Randy Wolf (15–9) || Salomón Torres (5–5) || Mike Williams (28) || 16,383 || 82–68
|- style="background:#bfb"
| 151 || September 16 || Marlins || 14–0 || Vicente Padilla (14–10) || Carl Pavano (11–12) || None || 36,479 || 83–68
|- style="background:#fbb"
| 152 || September 17 || Marlins || 4–11 || Mark Redman (13–9) || Brett Myers (14–8) || None || 33,761 || 83–69
|- style="background:#bfb"
| 153 || September 18 || Marlins || 5–4 || Rhéal Cormier (7–0) || Chad Fox (3–3) || None || 20,950 || 84–69
|- style="background:#bfb"
| 154 || September 19 || Reds || 7–3 || Randy Wolf (16–9) || Josh Hall (0–1) || None || 30,191 || 85–69
|- style="background:#fbb"
| 155 || September 20 || Reds || 0–2 || Todd Van Poppel (2–1) || Amaury Telemaco (1–4) || Chris Reitsma (10) || 35,239 || 85–70
|- style="background:#fbb"
| 156 || September 21 || Reds || 3–4 || Dan Serafini (1–3) || Vicente Padilla (14–11) || Chris Reitsma (11) || 57,883 || 85–71
|- style="background:#fbb"
| 157 || September 23 || @ Marlins || 4–5 || Michael Tejera (3–3) || Mike Williams (1–7) || Ugueth Urbina (30) || 25,311 || 85–72
|- style="background:#fbb"
| 158 || September 24 || @ Marlins || 5–6 || Josh Beckett (9–8) || Brett Myers (14–9) || Ugueth Urbina (31) || 28,520 || 85–73
|- style="background:#fbb"
| 159 || September 25 || @ Marlins || 4–8 || Brad Penny (14–10) || Randy Wolf (16–10) || None || 31,935 || 85–74
|- style="background:#fbb"
| 160 || September 26 || Braves || 0–6 || Horacio Ramírez (12–4) || Vicente Padilla (14–12) || None || 58,096 || 85–75
|- style="background:#bfb"
| 161 || September 27 || Braves || 7–6 (10) || Rhéal Cormier (8–0) || Ray King (3–4) || None || 58,303 || 86–75
|- style="background:#fbb"
| 162 || September 28 || Braves || 2–5 || Greg Maddux (16–11) || Kevin Millwood' (14–12) || Jason Marquis (1) || 58,554 || 86–76
|-

Roster

Player stats

BattingNote: G = Games played; AB = At bats; H = Hits; Avg. = Batting average; HR = Home runs; RBI = Runs batted in  

Pitching

 Starting pitchers Note: G = Games pitched; IP = Innings pitched; W = Wins; L = Losses; ERA = Earned run average; SO = StrikeoutsOther pitchersNote: G = Games pitched; IP = Innings pitched; W = Wins; L = Losses; ERA = Earned run average; SO = Strikeouts Relief pitchers Note: G = Games pitched; W = Wins; L = Losses; SV = Saves; ERA = Earned run average: SO = Strikeouts''

Farm system

References

External links
2003 Philadelphia Phillies season at Baseball Reference

Philadelphia Phillies seasons
Philadelphia Phillies Season, 2003
Philadelphia Phillies